Inscape, in visual art, is a term especially associated with certain works of Chilean artist Roberto Matta, but it is also used in other senses within the visual arts. Though the term inscape has been applied to stylistically diverse artworks, it usually conveys some notion of representing the artist's psyche as a kind of interior landscape. The word inscape can therefore be read as a kind of portmanteau, combining interior (or inward) with landscape.

The psychological inscape: surrealist, abstract, and fantastic art

According to Professor Claude Cernuschi, writing in a catalogue for a Matta exhibition at Boston College (see external link below), Matta's use of the term inscape for a series of landscape-like abstract or surrealist paintings reflects "the psychoanalytic view of the mind as a three-dimensional space: the 'inscape'." The 'inscape' concept is particularly apt for Matta's works of the late 1930s. As Dawn Adès (p. 233) writes, "A series of brilliant oil paintings done during the years of his [Matta's] first association with the Surrealists explore visual metaphors for the mental landscape." And Valerie Fletcher, in Crosscurrents of Modernism (p. 241), writes that during this time Matta "created with startling mastery the paintings he called 'inscapes' or 'psychological morphologies.' " See also Miriam Basilio's essay, "Wifredo Lam's 'The Jungle' and Matta's 'Inscapes' ".

The term inscape was later taken up by the leading Australian surrealist James Gleeson, American abstract artists such as James Brooks, Jane Frank, and Mary Frank (no relation), and even a group of British fantasy artists founded by Brigid Marlin in 1961 and calling themselves the 'Inscape Group.' (The latter group may have had in mind another sense of the word 'inscape', associated with the British poet Gerard Manley Hopkins. See the article titled simply 'inscape' for more information on this.)  More recently, in a 1998 review of a Mary Frank exhibition in New York City (cited below), Carol Diehl writes, "Titled 'Inscapes', the paintings are landscapes of the soul...."

Also clearly referring to the psychoanalytical meaning of the word as described by Prof. Cernuschi and others above, the leading journal of art therapy was formerly called simply Inscape.  The journal is now called International journal of art therapy : Inscape. (This is not to be confused with the Inscape magazine produced by Brigid Marlin's Society for Art of Imagination.)

Architectural interiors as 'inscapes'
The word "inscape" is sometimes used, perhaps with a bit of poetic license, to refer to the domain of interior design, suggesting that the interior of a house or building is a kind of interior (or indoor) landscape, a counterpart to the landscape surrounding the structure. This is the sense suggested by the name of the South African interior design school Inscape Design College, which see. It could be, however, that this use of the term is intended as a double-entendre, evoking those other meanings of "inscape".

See also
Roberto Matta
James Gleeson
Surrealism
James Brooks (painter)
Jane Frank
Mary Frank
Landscape art
Brigid Marlin
The Society for Art of Imagination (includes information on the "Inscape Group")
Fantasy art
Fantastic art
Inscape (poetic term associated with Gerard Manley Hopkins)

References

Books
Ades, Dawn. Art in Latin America (New Haven : Yale University Press, 1989)   
Basilio, Miriam;  Museo del Barrio.;  Museum of Modern Art (New York, N.Y.). Latin American & Caribbean art : MoMA at El Museo (New York : El Museo del Barrio and the Museum of Modern Art : Distributed by Distributed Art Publishers, 2004) ,  (see Miriam Basilio's essay, "Wifredo Lam's The Jungle and Matta's 'Inscapes' ")
Casson Hugh. M. Inscape: The design of interiors Architectural Press. London. 1968,  / 
Fletcher, Valerie J; Hirshhorn Museum and Sculpture Garden. Crosscurrents of modernism : four Latin American pioneers : Diego Rivera, Joaquín Torres-García, Wifredo Lam, Matta = Intercambios del modernismo : cuatro precursores latinoamericanos : Diego Rivera, Joaquín Torres-García, Wifredo Lam, Matta (Washington, D.C. : Hirshhorn Museum and Sculpture Garden in association with the Smithsonian Institution Press, 1992), ;

Article

Sandler, Irving H. "James Brooks and the abstract inscape", ARTnews (New York : Art Foundation, 1963) OCLC: 54034429

External links
Boston College, Matta exhibition, McMullen Museum of Art, February 2004 
Review article by Carol Diehl: "Mary Frank at D.C. Moore - New York, New York", Art in America,  Nov. 1998
Information on International journal of art therapy : Inscape at psychotherapyarena.com

Painting
Visual arts genres
Landscape art by type